Yola may refer to:

Culture 
 Yola language, Forth and Bargy dialect, an Anglic language, historically of County Wexford, Ireland
 Jola people, of Africa

Music 
 Yola (album), a 2001 album by Eleanor McEvoy
 YOLA, Youth Orchestra Los Angeles
 Yowlah, folk dance native to the United Arab Emirates and Oman

Places 
 Yola, Adamawa, capital of Adamawa State, Nigeria
 Yola Airport, airport in the Adamawa State of Nigeria
 Yola North, a Local Government Area of Adamawa State, Nigeria
 Yola South, a Local Government Area of Adamawa State, Nigeria
 Yola Diocese,  a diocese of the Anglican Church of Nigeria in the Province of Jos
 County of Yola, the original name of Yolo County, California

People 
 Yola (singer) (born 1983), English singer-songwriter
 Yola Berrocal (born 1970), Spanish media personality, dancer, singer, and actress
 Yola Cain (1954–2000), Jamaican-born aviator
 Yola d'Avril (1906–1984), French-born actress
 Yola Ramírez (born 1935), internationally renowned tennis player

Other uses 
 Yola (beetle), a genus of beetles
 Yola (webhost), a webhosting company
 Yawl, sailing ship (Spanish: yola)

See also 
 Yolanda (disambiguation)